Genoa: Le Strade Nuove and the system of the Palazzi dei Rolli is a UNESCO World Heritage Site which includes a number of streets and palaces in the center of Genoa, in Northwestern Italy.

 The Strade Nuove (Italian for "New Streets") are a group of streets built by the Genoese aristocracy during the expansion of the city at a time when the Republic of Genoa was at the height of its financial and seafaring power. These are Via Giuseppe Garibaldi (1558-1583, formerly Strada Maggiore or Strada Nuova) and Via Balbi (1602-1620, formerly Strada Balbi), later followed by Via Cairoli (1778-1786, formerly Strada Nuovissima).
 The Palazzi dei Rolli (Italian for "Palaces of the Lists") are a group of palaces - most of which also date from the late 16th and early 17th centuries - which were associated to a particular system of ‘public lodging’ in private residences, whereby notable guests on State visit to the Republic were hosted in one of these palaces on behalf of the State.

On 13 July 13, 2006, forty-two of the 163 palaces originally included in one the five public list called "Rolli" (Italian for "lists") were selected as a World Heritage Site by the UNESCO special committee meeting in Vilnius (Lithuania). The site includes an ensemble of Renaissance and Baroque palaces along the so-called ‘new streets’ (Strade Nuove), which offer an extraordinary variety of different solutions, achieving universal value in adapting to the particular characteristics of the site and to the requirements of a specific social and economic organization. They also offer an original example of a public network of private residences designated to host state visits.

On January 20, 2007, UNESCO unveiled a plaque in via Garibaldi, the former Strada Nuova, explaining the reasons for inclusion of the Strade Nuove and the system of the Palazzi dei Rolli within the World Heritage Sites: 
Some of the Palazzi dei Rolli are used today as public buildings, museums, offices and private residences. Among the palaces open to the public, Palazzo Rosso, Palazzo Bianco and Palazzo Doria Tursi jointly constitute the Strada Nuova Museums located in via Garibaldi.

The Rolli of Genoa 
The Rolli di Genovamore precisely, the Rolli degli alloggiamenti pubblici di Genova (Italian for "Lists of the public lodgings of Genoa") were the official lists at the time of the Republic of Genoa of the private palaces and mansions, belonging to the most distinguished Genoese families, whichif chosen through a public lotterywere obliged to host on behalf of the Government the most notable visitors during their State visit to the Republic.

Later, these palaces hosted many famous visitors to Genoa during their Grand Tour, a cultural itinerary around Italy.

Today, Palazzi dei Rolli as a collective name represents the set of the most prestigious palaces of the historical center of Genoa, especially along the so-called Strade Nuove, the "New Streets" built by the Genoese aristocracy at the peak of Genoa's economic power in the 16th and 17th century (Via Giuseppe Garibaldi, formerly Strada Nuova or Via Aurea, Via Cairoli, formerly Strada Nuovissima, and via Balbi, now the home of the University of Genoa).

History 
Between the first half of the 16th century and the first half of the 17th century, the Genoese nobility started a careful town planning to transform the existing medieval city and initiate a sizeable urban expansion to the North. The move to expand the antique palaces and to build new sumptuous ones was driven by the extraordinary wealth that came into the city through prosperous financing activities towards several European powers. In particular, the Genoese aristocracy financed the expensive undertakings of the Spanish Crown, such as the mercenary army that Spain kept in Flanders from 1566 to the peace of Westphalia in 1648. The ruling class of Genoa, mixing nobility of blood with new mercantile wealth, sought to underpin their prestige by the construction of grand city palaces and suburban villas of unusual splendor.

The Rollimore precisely, the Rolli degli alloggiamenti pubblici di Genova (Italian for "Lists of the public lodgings of Genoa")were official lists established in 1576 by the Genoese Senatean aristocratic institution which took prominence as a result of the oligarchic reforms of the Prince and Admiral Andrea Doriato determine the palaces available to the Government to ensure that the Republic of Genoa could offer appropriate lodging to the most notable guests who routinely visited the city, such as princes, kings, diplomats or religious authorities. The fact that not one single palace was chosen, but many, was a sign that the authorities of the Republic of Genoa considered the whole city as a "republican royal palace".

The Palazzi dei Rolli were subdivided on the basis of their prestige into three categorieswith size, beauty and importance as main criteriafor selecting whether each palace was suitable to accommodate cardinals, princes and viceroys, feudal lords, ambassadors or governors. Only three palaces ere deemed suitable to accommodate the highest dignitaries, such as Popes, Emperors, Kings and most important Cardinals and Princes: the Palazzo Doria Spinola in Salita Santa Caterina, the Palazzo Grimaldi Doria Tursi in today's via Garibaldi and the Palazzo Lercari Parodi, also in the current Via Garibaldi.

The "Rolli" or "Lists" preserved to this day were five: 1576 (including 52 palaces); 1588 (111); 1599 (150); 1614 (96); and 1664 (95). In total, there were 162 palaces included at least once in one of these official lists.

Quotes 

 Bring the letter to Mrs. Mojon, in via Balbi; this is one of the three names of one major street, which is also the most beautiful of Italy (Stendhal, Journal d'un vojage en Italie et en Suisse pendant l'annee 1828, 1828)
 I tried to visit three galleries of famous paintings in via Balbi. As the owners have the good habit of living in the rooms where the paintings are located, one needs to call several times; and often the impatience generated in me by the arrogant refusals of the servants takes away the joy of seeing the paintings. The rich of Genoa live almost always on the third floor to be able to see the sea. The staircases are made of marble, but when - after climbing one hundred of those steps - a servant keeps you waiting for fifteen minutes then says: "His Excellency is still in his room, come back tomorrow", it is allowed to show a bout of ill temper, especially when one needs to leave in the evening (Stendhal, Memoires d'un touriste, 1837)

World Heritage Site 
Le Strade Nuove and the system of the Palazzi dei Rolli became a World Heritage Site in 2006. The criteria for this selection were explained by the UNESCO as follows:
 Criterion (ii): The ensemble of the Strade Nuove and the related palaces exhibit an important interchange of values on the development of architecture and town planning in the 16th and 17th centuries. Through the architectural treatises of the time, these examples were publicized making the Strade Nuove and the late-Renaissance palaces of Genoa a significant landmark in the development of Mannerist and Baroque architecture in Europe.
 Criterion (iv): The Strade Nuove in Genoa are an outstanding example of an urban ensemble consisting of aristocratic palaces of high architectural value, which illustrate the economy and politics of the mercantile city of Genoa at the height of its power in the 16th and 17th centuries. The project proposed a new and innovative spirit that characterized the Siglo de los Genoveses (1563 to 1640). In 1576, the Republic of Genoa established a legally based list of Rolli recognizing the most outstanding palaces for official lodging of distinguished guests.

The Palazzi dei Rolli included in the World Heritage Site 
These are the forty-two palaces currently included by UNESCO in the World Heritage Site:

The Palazzi dei Rolli not included in the UNESCO list 
The following Palazzi dei Rolli are still preserved but, due to partitioning or altered use, have not been included in the UNESCO World Heritage Site:

Rolli Days
In 2009, after the Palazzi dei Rolli were recognized as a UNESCO World Heritage Site, the Municipality of Genoa started the so-called Rolli Days, dedicated to the free visit of both public and private buildings. Each time a different itinerary is proposed, with art students, architects and professional guides offering guided tours, almost all of them for free.

The Rolli Days happen twice a year, normally during a weekend in May and one in September. An exception to this rule was made to mark the tenth anniversary of UNESCO's recognition in 2016, when three weekends were dedicated to the Rolli Days in April, May and October.

The number of notable buildings open to the public during the Rolli Days has been increasing over time. More recently, also palaces not originally belonging to the Rolli system (as an example, some historical buildings of the University of Genoa), suburban villas and churches have been added to the tour offerings.

Palazzo Grillo seat of the De André Foundation 
One of the Rolli palaces - Palazzo Grillo in Piazza delle Vigne - was intended by the property to host the Foundation named after Fabrizio De André, famous songwriter from Genoa.  Given the time required for the restoration of the building, the inauguration of the facility is scheduled for 2019, the tenth anniversary of his death in 2009.

Inside the home, located in the centre of Genoa, will be a café and / or a restaurant, an auditorium, public rooms (classrooms and information) devoted to the study of the Genoese school of singer-songwriters, the top floor of the residence could be a meeting place between guests.

FAI is in the process of completing the rehabilitation and restoration of Villa Saluzzo Bombrini, in the Albaro quarter, known as Il Paradiso and inhabited in his youth by De André.

Images

See also 
 Via Garibaldi
 Via Cairoli
 Via Balbi
 Republic of Genoa
 Genoa

References

Bibliography 
 Fiorella Caraceni (1992), Una strada rinascimentale: via Garibaldi a Genova, Genova, SAGEP
 Giorgio Doria (1995), Nobiltà e investimenti a Genova in Età moderna, Genova
 Gioconda Pomella (2007), Guida Completa ai Palazzi dei Rolli Genova, Genova, De Ferrari Editore()
 Mauro Quercioli (2008), I Palazzi dei Rolli di Genova, Roma, Libreria dello Stato
 Fiorella Caraceni Poleggi (2001), Palazzi Antichi e Moderni di Genova raccolti e disegnati da Pietro Paolo Rubens (1652), Genova, Tormena Editore
 Mario Labò (2003), I palazzi di Genova di P.P. Rubens, Genova, Nuova Editrice Genovese

External links 
  Official website of the Rolli and Nuove Strade of Genoa - World Heritage Site 
 http://www.palazzideirolli.it/ Palazzi dei Rolli di Genova UNESCO World Heritage Site 
  Rolli of Genoa
  Insight
   Process of inclusion among World Heritage Sites
 The reasons for granting UNESCO status

Rolli
World Heritage Sites in Italy
Museums in Genoa
Historic house museums in Italy